John Kennedy Melling (11 January 1927 – 10 October 2018) was a British accountant, writer and broadcaster on theatre.

Melling built a large collection of theatre ephemera and was a drama critic for The Stage for 30 years.

Selected publications
 Southend Playhouses from 1793 (1969)
 Discovering Lost Theatres (1969)
 Discovering London's Guilds and Liveries (1973)
 Discovering Theatre Ephemera (1974)
 Murder Done to Death: Parody and Pastiche in Detective Fiction (1996)

References 

1927 births
2018 deaths
English accountants
British theatre critics
People from Westcliff-on-Sea
English collectors
English non-fiction writers
20th-century English businesspeople